Coila is an unincorporated community located in Carroll County, Mississippi, United States. Coila is situated approximately 9 miles south of Carrollton on Highway 17. Coila is part of the Greenwood, Mississippi micropolitan area and its ZIP code is 38923.

"Coila" is a Choctaw phrase which translates to "panther comes there".

A post office first began operation under the name Coila in 1849.

Notable citizens
Blues guitarist Brewer Phillips.

References

Unincorporated communities in Carroll County, Mississippi
Unincorporated communities in Mississippi
Mississippi placenames of Native American origin